Bittacomorphella is a genus of pygmy phantom crane flies in the family Ptychopteridae. There are about 11 described species in Bittacomorphella.

Species
These 11 species belong to the genus Bittacomorphella:
 Bittacomorphella esakii Tokunaga, 1938
 Bittacomorphella fenderiana Alexander, 1947
 Bittacomorphella furcata Fasbender & Courtney, 2017
 Bittacomorphella gongshana
 Bittacomorphella jonesi (Johnson, 1905) (pygmy phantom crane fly)
 Bittacomorphella lini Young & Fang, 2011
 Bittacomorphella nipponensis Alexander, 1924
 Bittacomorphella pacifica Alexander, 1958
 Bittacomorphella sackenii (Roder, 1890)
 Bittacomorphella thaiensis Alexander, 1953
 Bittacomorphella zhaotongensis

References

Further reading

 

Ptychopteridae
Articles created by Qbugbot